Eden is an original CGI anime streaming television series produced by CGCG Studio Inc. and Qubic Pictures. Directed by Yasuhiro Irie and written by Kimiko Ueno, it was released on May 27, 2021, on Netflix.

Plot
A thousand years after humans disappeared from Earth, a gleaming monolithic city known as "Eden 3" is inhabited solely by artificially intelligent robots whose former masters vanished long ago although they continue to grow agricultural produce. On a routine assignment on the surrounding farmland two maintenance robots accidentally awaken a human baby girl, Sara Grace, from stasis, questioning their belief that humans were a forbidden ancient myth. Together, the two robots secretly raise Sara in a safe haven outside Eden 3.

Voice cast

Production
First announced in April 2019, the series was originally given a late 2020 release window. However, at the Netflix Anime Festival in October 2020, it was revealed that it would be delayed to May 2021.

Yasuhiro Irie serves as director, with Kimiko Ueno handling the scripts. Kevin Penkin serves as the series' composer.

Episodes

Media

Manga
A manga adaptation illustrated by Tsuyoshi Isomoto was serialized in Shōnen Gahōsha's Young King Ours GH magazine from February 16, 2021 to February 16, 2022.

References

External links
 
 

2021 anime ONAs
Anime with original screenplays
Japanese computer-animated television series
Japanese-language Netflix original programming
Netflix original anime
Science fiction anime and manga
Seinen manga
Shōnen Gahōsha manga
Television series about robots
Television series set in the future